John Farrell is the director of YouTube in Latin America.

Education
Farrell holds a joint MBA degree from the University of Texas at Austin and Instituto Tecnologico de Estudios Superiores de Monterrey (ITESM).

Career
His business career began at Skytel, and later at Iridium as head of Business Development, in Washington DC, where he supported the design and launched the first satellite location service in the world and established international distribution agreements.

He co-founded Adetel, the first company to provide internet access to residential communities and businesses in Mexico. After becoming General Manager of Adetel, he developed a partnership with TV Azteca in order to create the first internet access prepaid card in the country known as the ToditoCard.  Later in his career, John Farrell worked for Televisa in Mexico City as Director of Business Development for Esmas.com. There he established a strategic alliance with a leading telecommunications provider to launch co-branded Internet and telephone services. He also led initial efforts to launch social networking services, leveraging Televisa’s content and media channels.

Google
Farrel joined Google in 2004 as Director of Business Development for Asia and Latin America. On April 7, 2008, he was promoted to the position of General Manager for Google Mexico, replacing Alonso Gonzalo. He is now director of YouTube in Latin America, responsible for developing audiences, managing partnerships and growing Google’s video display business. John is also part of Google’s Latin America leadership management team and contributes to Google’s strategy in the region. He is Vice President of the IAB (Interactive Advertising Bureau), a member of the AMIPCI (Mexican Internet Association) Advisory Board, an active Endeavor mentor, and member of YPO.

References

American computer businesspeople
American Internet celebrities
Google employees
Living people
McCombs School of Business alumni
Mexican people of Irish descent
Year of birth missing (living people)